José Edmílson Gomes de Moraes (born 10 July 1976), known simply as Edmílson, is a Brazilian football executive and former professional footballer. He's currently a technical consultant for São Caetano.

Either a defensive midfielder or a central defender, he played in three countries in his professional career, representing with team and individual success São Paulo, Lyon and Barcelona (four seasons each in the last two clubs).

Having won 39 caps with Brazil, Edmílson represented the nation at the 2002 World Cup, helping it win the tournament.

Following the 2022 World Cup; Edmílson has been mentioned as one of the favourites to succeed Tite as Head Coach of Brazil.

Club career

São Paulo, Lyon
Born in Taquaritinga, São Paulo, Edmílson signed for São Paulo FC in 1995, winning two Campeonato Paulista titles during his spell. In 2000 he joined Olympique Lyonnais in France at the same time as compatriot Caçapa, also a stopper, both being important as the club won the League Cup in his first season.

In the ensuing off-season, Juninho Pernambucano also made the move to the Rhône-Alpes, and often partnered Edmílson in central midfield as they went on to win three consecutive Ligue 1 titles.

Barcelona
In July 2004, Edmílson signed with FC Barcelona for a reported €10 million. He made his La Liga debut on 19 September in a 1–1 away draw against Atlético Madrid, and finished his debut campaign with only six matches as the Catalans won the national championship; on 3 October, after having come on as a substitute for Samuel Eto'o during a home fixture against CD Numancia, he himself had to be substituted after only five minutes on the pitch, going on to be sidelined for several months due to injury.

Edmílson recovered fully for 2005–06, collecting 41 appearances across all competitions, and playing an important part in Frank Rijkaard's team as they won the league and the season's UEFA Champions League. In the latter competition, he appeared in nine matches – six complete – including the first half of the final against Arsenal.

After a poor 2007–08 campaign, both individually and collectively, and following the departure of he club's manager Rijkaard, 32-year-old Edmílson left Barcelona as his contract was not renewed.

Later years
On 23 May 2008, Edmílson signed for one year with Villarreal CF. After only a couple of months, however, he returned to his country, joining Sociedade Esportiva Palmeiras on a two-year deal and scoring his first goal in the first stage of the Copa Libertadores against Club Real Potosí, on 29 January 2009, just eight days after his arrival.

After not having appeared in the São Paulo championship in 2010, Edmílson cut ties with Palmeiras and, on 31 January, returned to Spain, agreeing to a five-month contract with struggling Real Zaragoza – at that time, he was already the bearer of an Italian passport, thus not counting as a foreign player. He appeared regularly during the remainder of the campaign, as the Aragonese managed to finish out of the relegation zone, and saw his link being extended for another year.

On 12 September 2010, Edmílson scored his first goal for Zaragoza, who lost 3–5 at home against Málaga CF. In June 2011, after having contributed with only 12 games to the club's final escape from relegation, he returned to his country and joined Ceará Sporting Club, where he remained until his retirement at the end of the year.

International career
Edmílson made his debut for the Brazil national team on 18 July 2000, against Paraguay. Selected to the 2002 FIFA World Cup in Japan and South Korea, he helped the Seleção win their fifth tournament, appearing in six out of seven games and scoring his first (and only) international goal in the 5–2 group stage win over Costa Rica.

Originally selected to the 2006 World Cup in Germany, Edmílson was forced to withdraw from the squad after sustaining a knee injury in training before the tournament.

Career statistics 
Internationals goals

Personal life
Edmílson is a devout evangelical Christian, having converted when he was 16 years old.

Honours
São Paulo
Campeonato Paulista: 1998, 2000
Copa Master de CONMEBOL: 1996

Lyon
Ligue 1: 2001–02, 2002–03, 2003–04
Coupe de la Ligue: 2000–01
Trophée des Champions: 2003

Barcelona
La Liga: 2004–05, 2005–06
Supercopa de España: 2005
UEFA Champions League: 2005–06

Brazil
FIFA World Cup: 2002

References

External links

 

Official foundation website 

1976 births
Living people
Footballers from São Paulo (state)
Brazilian people of Italian descent
Brazilian footballers
Association football defenders
Association football midfielders
Association football utility players
Campeonato Brasileiro Série A players
Campeonato Brasileiro Série C players
São Paulo FC players
Sociedade Esportiva Palmeiras players
Ceará Sporting Club players
Ligue 1 players
Olympique Lyonnais players
La Liga players
FC Barcelona players
Villarreal CF players
Real Zaragoza players
Brazil international footballers
2001 FIFA Confederations Cup players
2002 FIFA World Cup players
FIFA World Cup-winning players
Brazilian expatriate footballers
Expatriate footballers in France
Expatriate footballers in Spain
Brazilian expatriate sportspeople in France
Brazilian expatriate sportspeople in Spain
UEFA Champions League winning players
Converts to evangelical Christianity
Brazilian evangelicals
People from Taquaritinga